The following television stations operate on virtual channel 31 in the United States:

 'Unknown' in Pittsburgh, Pennsylvania
 K07AAD-D in Fort Worth, Texas
 K09YO-D in Thomasville, Colorado
 K10FQ-D in Big Laramie, etc., Wyoming
 K10RV-D in Centerville, Washington
 K12QM-D in Thomasville, Colorado
 K14KL-D in Pleasant Valley, Colorado
 K14LB-D in Idalia, Colorado
 K14OV-D in Snowmass Village, Colorado
 K15MD-D in Wray, Colorado
 K15MH-D in Anton, Colorado
 K18FN-D in Peetz, Colorado
 K18GD-D in Redstone, Colorado
 K21HF-D in Aspen, Colorado
 K22KW-D in Julesburg, Colorado
 K29GI-D in Holyoke, Colorado
 K31AD-D in Victorville, etc., California
 K31FD-D in Boise, Idaho
 K31FU-D in Golconda, Nevada
 K31HO-D in Shreveport, Louisiana
 K31HS-D in Malad, Idaho
 K31KH-D in Stateline, Nevada
 K31KT-D in Moses Lake, Washington
 K31KV-D in St. James, Minnesota
 K31LL-D in Midland/Odessa, Texas
 K31MP-D in Grand Forks, North Dakota
 K31NF-D in Verde Valley, etc., Arizona
 K31NO-D in Bend, Oregon
 K31OE-D in Dove Creek, etc., Colorado
 K31PC-D in Yuma, Colorado
 K31PP-D in Sioux City, Iowa
 K31PR-D in Tyler, Texas
 K31PZ-D in Clarksville, Arkansas
 K31QA-D in Deadwood, South Dakota
 K33FI-D in Akron, Colorado
 K33GM-D in Haxtun, Colorado
 K33HY-D in Basalt, Colorado
 K34OS-D in Sterling/South Logan County, Colorado
 K35JY-D in Lamont, Oklahoma
 K35KI-D in St. James, Minnesota
 K36LA-D in Kabetogama, Minnesota
 KAGN-CD in Crowley, Louisiana
 KANG-LD in San Angelo, Texas
 KBID-LP in Fresno, California
 KBLT-LD in Anchorage, Alaska
 KBTF-CD in Bakersfield, California
 KDCU-DT in Derby, Kansas
 KDKF in Klamath Falls, Oregon
 KDVR in Denver, Colorado
 KEOT-LD in Abilene, Texas
 KEYU in Borger, Texas
 KIMG-LD in Ventura, California
 KLAX-TV in Alexandria, Louisiana
 KLDY-LD in Anchorage, Alaska
 KLHO-LD in Oklahoma City, Oklahoma
 KMAX-TV in Sacramento, California
 KNBX-CD in Las Vegas, Nevada
 KPLE-CD in Killeen, Texas
 KSMV-LD in Los Angeles, California
 KTFO-CD in Austin, Texas
 KTNW in Richland, Washington
 KTPE-LD in Kansas City, Missouri
 KVDF-CD in San Antonio, Texas
 KVMD in Twentynine Palms, California
 KVUI in Pocatello, Idaho
 KWBM in Harrison, Arkansas
 KWNL-CD in Winslow, Arkansas
 KXOF-CD in Laredo, Texas
 KXOK-LD in Enid, Oklahoma
 W16DU-D in Bloomington, Wisconsin
 W31DV-D in Guayama, Puerto Rico
 W31EP-D in Panama City, Florida
 W31EX-D in Bangor, Maine
 W31FA-D in Elmhurst, Michigan
 W31FD-D in Bluffton-Hilton Head, South Carolina
 W31FF-D in Maple Valley, Michigan
 W32FJ-D in Montgomery, Alabama
 W39CV-D in Minocqua, Wisconsin
 WAAY-TV in Huntsville, Alabama
 WAHU-LD in Crozet, Virginia
 WAXC-LD in Alexander City, Alabama
 WCRN-LD in Boston, Massachusetts
 WDKT-LD in Hendersonville, North Carolina
 WDMA-CD in Macon, Georgia
 WFXL in Albany, Georgia
 WHIG-CD in Rocky Mount, North Carolina
 WHLA-TV in La Crosse, Wisconsin
 WIIC-LD in Pittsburgh, Pennsylvania
 WJDE-CD in Nashville, Tennessee
 WJNI-LD in North Charleston, South Carolina
 WKME-CD in Kississimee, Florida
 WKOH in Owensboro, Kentucky
 WMBD-TV in Peoria, Illinois
 WMBP-LD in Mobile, Alabama
 WMVJ-CD in Melbourne, Florida
 WNNE in Hartford, Vermont
 WPBM-CD in Scottsville, Kentucky
 WPXD-TV in Ann Arbor, Michigan
 WPXN-TV in New York, New York
 WRDE-LD in Salisbury, Maryland
 WRPT in Hibbing, Minnesota
 WRUE-LD in Salisbury, Maryland
 WRZB-LD in Washington, D.C.
 WSPY-LD in Earlville, Illinois
 WTMO-CD in Orlando, Florida
 WTWL-LD in Wilmington, North Carolina
 WUBX-CD in Durham, etc., North Carolina
 WUHF in Rochester, New York
 WUNU in Lumberton, North Carolina
 WVND-LD in Gainesville, Georgia
 WWPB in Hagerstown, Maryland

The following stations, which are no longer licensed, formerly operated on virtual channel 31 in the United States:
 K03IS-D in Sioux City, Iowa
 K24JR-D in Orr, Minnesota
 K31KR-D in Three Forks, Montana
 K31KU-D in Rapid City, South Dakota
 KBLI-LD in Lincoln, Nebraska
 KGFZ-LD in Yakima, etc., Washington
 W17EQ-D in Byromville, Georgia
 W31CZ-D in Tampa, Florida
 W31DZ-D in Clarksdale, Mississippi
 WDDM-LD in Tallahassee, Florida
 WSJU-TV in San Juan, Puerto Rico
 WUDJ-LD in Crozet, Virginia
 WUDP-LD in Lafayette, Indiana

References

31 virtual